Birthday Party Bash (known in Europe as It's My Birthday) is a party video game for the Wii. It was developed by American studio Cat Daddy Games and published by 2K Games on July 14, 2009.

Gameplay
Birthday Party Bash features 22 minigames, including "Hot Potato Toss" and "Super Sack Racing". The game featured the "Happy Birthday To You" song. The game also came with a party planning guide for various occasions. In-game advertising was present for the Duncan Hines brand of cake mixes.

Reception
Common Sense Media gave the game 4 stars out of 5, praising the variety of minigames and its ease of use in creating playlists.

References

2009 video games
2K games
Party video games
Wii games
Wii-only games
Video games about birthdays
Video games developed in the United States
Cat Daddy Games games